The 2013 DreamHack SteelSeries Counter Strike: Global Offensive Championship, also known as DreamHack Winter 2013, was the first  Counter-Strike: Global Offensive Major Championship. The tournament was organized by DreamHack and sponsored by Valve. The competition was held during the Winter 2013 DreamHack digital festival at the Elmia Exhibition and Convention Centre in Jönköping, Sweden. Six invitees joined ten qualifiers to form the sixteen team event. Community funding helped to build the US$250,000 prize pool. The tournament had a peak 145,000 concurrent viewers on Twitch and the in-game viewing client.

Format
Six teams – Astana Dragons, compLexity Gaming, VeryGames, Clan-Mystik, Fnatic, and Team iBuyPower – were directly invited to participate in the tournament.

In addition to those six teams, ten other teams qualified through other tournaments. For instance, Ninjas in Pyjamas qualified by winning the DreamHack Summer 2013 tournament; Copenhagen Wolves qualified by winning EMS One Fall 2013; LGB eSports qualified through an online qualifier; and Reason Gaming qualified through the BYOC qualifier. 

Teams were split up into four groups, and all group matches were best-of-ones. The highest seed would play the lowest seed in each group and the second and third seeds would play against each other. The winner of those two matches would play each other to determine which team moved on to the playoff stage, while the losers of the first round of matches also played. The loser of the lower match was then eliminated from the tournament. With one team advanced and one eliminated, the two remaining teams would play an elimination match for the second playoff spot. This format is known as the GSL format, named for the Global StarCraft II League.

The playoff bracket consisted of eight teams, two from each group. All of these matches were best-of-three, single elimination. Teams advanced in the bracket until a final winner was decided, and the eight teams to make the playoff bracket earned automatic invitations to the next Major, EMS One Katowice 2014.

Map Pool
There were five maps to choose from. In the group stage, each team bans two maps so that one remains. In the playoffs, each team bans one map and chooses one map; the remaining map would be the decider map of the series.

Broadcast Talent
Hosts
 Scott "SirScoots" Smith
 Jonas "bsl" Vikan

Commentators
 Corey "dunN" Dunn
 Tomi "lurppis" Kovanen
 Stuart "TosspoT" Saw

Analyst
 Duncan "Thorin" Shields"

Teams

Group stage

Group A

Opening matches

Elimination match

Winners' match

Decider match

Group B

Opening matches

Elimination match

Winners' match

Decider match

Group C

Opening matches

Winners' match

Elimination match

Decider match

Group D

Opening matches

Winners' match

Elimination match

Decider match

Playoffs

Bracket

Quarterfinals

Ninjas in Pyjamas won series 2–1

VeryGames won series 2–1

Fnatic won series 2–1

compLextity Gaming won series 2–1

Semifinals

Ninjas in Pyjamas won series 2–1

Fnatic won series 2–0

Finals

Fnatic won series 2–1

Final standings

External links 
 
 DreamHack TV

References 

2013 in esports
Counter-Strike: Global Offensive Majors
2013 in Swedish sport
DreamHack events